Howard Bell may refer to:
 Howard H. Bell (1913–2012), scholar of African American history
 Howard A. Bell (1888–1974), British angler